Zayn R. Kassam is an American religious studies scholar known for her work on gender roles in Islam and Indian philosophy. In January 2023, she began her term as Director of the Institute of Ismaili Studies.

Education and Professional Life 
Kassam was born and raised in Kenya. She completed her undergraduate and graduate degrees at McGill University. 

Kassam then began working at Pomona College in Claremont, California, where she served as Chair of the Religious Studies Department twice, Co-Chair of the Climate Study Group, Co-ordinator for Gender and Women’s Studies, and Co-ordinator for Middle Eastern Studies and eventually was appointed Associate Dean for Diversity, Equity and Inclusion and the John Knox McLean Professor of Religious Studies.  While at Pomona College, she was awarded three Wig Awards for Distinguished Teaching at Pomona College, as well as an American Academy of Religion Excellence in Teaching Award. She also served as director of the Pacific Basin Institute.

References

External links
Faculty page at Pomona College

Year of birth missing (living people)
Living people
Pomona College faculty
American Islamic studies scholars
Women's studies academics
American Indologists